Don't Forget the Lyrics! is the Singaporean version of the international game show Don't Forget the Lyrics!. In Singapore, an English-language version premiered on 27 November 2008, whereas the Chinese Mandarin-language version premiered on 25 August 2009 in addition to a special celebrity episodes in 2010.

English version
The Singapore version of the game show, hosted by Singapore Idol host Gurmit Singh, premiered on 27 November 2008 on MediaCorp Channel 5. It airs every Thursday night at 8:00pm. Contestants will sing their way to the top prize of S$500,000.

Similar to the American version, three backups were available during the game; each backup can only be used once throughout the game on any level but the final song. They were Backup Singer (二人帮), Two Words (一送一) and Three Lines (三提示).

Unlike the American version, contestants/teams who chose to attempt the final song (dubbed "Half-a-Million Song", or "$500,000 song" for the Chinese version) does not immediate raise the guaranteed cash value of $10,000 (in the American version, contestants/teams attempting the final song did raised the guaranteed cash from $25,000 to $100,000, which was the value for the sixth level), meaning the contestant would drop down to the $10,000 mark with an incorrect answer to the final song. This was first seen on the Chinese Version (see below).

Special episodes
The first episode on November 27, 2008 featured Singapore Idol contestants Hady Mirza, Jonathan Leong and Taufik Batisah for a Pop Stars Edition of the show. They earned a total of S$25,000 for charity.

During the Comic Mayhem episode in the Singapore version aired on March 5, 2009, the episode was mashup with another game show, Deal or No Deal, where the host Adrian Pang hosted the episode, and the show ended with the three contestants running away due to the time, and ended with the lyrics of the $10,000 song "Macrena", which the team did not lock in. The contestants for the first part of the Comic Mayhem Special were Phua Chu Kang (Gurmit Singh) from Phua Chu Kang Pte Ltd, Barberella (Michelle Chong) from The Noose and Sgt Dollah Abu Bakar (Suhaimi Yusof) from Police & Thief. The second episode on March 12, 2009, returned to normal where Gurmit Singh returned as host, where Adrianna Wow (Michelle Chong), Jojo Joget (Suhaimi Yusof) (both from The Noose) and Adrian Pang were the contestants. In the end, the team won S$50,000, which was given to charity.

Another special episode featured local Channel 5 babes in the form of Fiona Xie, Jade Seah and Andrea Fonseka. On the S$50,000 to S$100,000 mark, Andrea was confident of her answer to the song of "The Boy is Mine" with 12 missing words. The trio locked the lyrics, but was incorrect (only one word, "what's", was wrong, where the actual lyrics was "When will you get the picture, You're the past, I'm the future"), and as a result they were left with S$10,000 which was raised for charity.

On the final episode on April 9, 2009, MPs Maliki Osman and Baey Yam Keng participated in the game show, and raised S$25,000 for charity.

Mandarin version

First Version
The Mandarin version of Don't Forget the Lyrics premiered on 25 August 2009 at 8:00pm every Tuesday. It is hosted by Taiwanese host Sam Tseng. Contestants will be competing for the top prize of S$500,000. Similar to the English version, there were 10 normal episodes and 4 celebrity episodes. The prize money ladder is the same from the English version.

The highest amount won was $200,000 by a female contestant Wu Huixin (Chinese: 吴惠欣) over two episodes aired October 7 and 14, 2009. Wu chose not to attempt the $500,000 song, and she became the second-known largest winnings contestant on a Singaporean gameshow in almost eight years, behind another contestant, Steven Tan, who won $250,000 on a December 27, 2001 episode of Who Wants to be a Millionaire.

Unlike the English version, the Mandarin version did not have mentioning of how many words required in each song, opposing to other versions of the show (the Taiwanese version was also notable on doing so, though the Taiwanese version uses an alert system, the Singaporean version does not).

Celebrity Episodes
There were four celebrity episodes airing on the first, fifth, tenth and the final episodes. The first celebrity team consisting of three local comedians, Mark Lee, Michelle Tay and Henry Thia won S$10,000 for the charity; the second team featuring local Singaporean singers Joi Chua, Kelvin Tan and Chew Sin Huey raising S$10,000 for their charity; a third team featuring local television hosts Jeff Wang, Kym Ng and Quan Yi Fong winning S$25,000, and the last team, YES 933 DJs Dennis Chew, Seah Kar Huat and Siau Jia Hui, raised the largest for the celebrities in the series, with S$50,000. In total, S$95,000 were raised from the four teams.

Chinese version (All stars edition)
A third instalment of Singaporean's Don't Forget the Lyrics (titled ), started filming their 14 episodes from 7 to 12 May and 1 and 2 June 2010. Tseng was replaced by Mark Lee as the host.

The game was mostly similar to the first two series (mostly celebrities versions), but all of the values in the prize money ladder were divided by ten, meaning that the top prize was reduced to S$50,000. The progression ladder is as follows:

Episodes

None of the contestants either raised S$20,000 or (the top prize of) S$50,000 in the charities; only two teams (indicated in asterisks*) had made it to the final S$50,000 level, both teams attempted the level unsuccessfully and were left with S$1,000.

References

Don't Forget the Lyrics!
Musical game shows
2008 Singaporean television series debuts
Channel 5 (Singapore) original programming
Channel 8 (Singapore) original programming